The 1904 Norwegian Football Cup was the third season of the Norwegian annual knockout football tournament. The tournament was open for all NFF member clubs and organised by defending cup winner Odd. Four teams joined this competition. Odd won their second consecutive title.

Semi-finals

|colspan="3" style="background-color:#97DEFF"|3 September 1904

|}

Final

See also
1904 in Norwegian football

References

External links
RSSSF Football Archive

Norwegian Football Cup seasons
Norway
Football Cup